The Boys' 100 metres at the 2013 World Youth Championships in Athletics was held  on 10 and 11 July.

Medalists

Records 
Prior to the competition, the following records were as follows.

Heats 
Qualification rule: first 2 of each heat (Q) qualified.

Heat 1

Heat 2

Heat 3

Heat 4

Heat 5

Heat 6

Heat 7

Heat 8

Heat 9

Heat 10

Heat 11

Heat 12

Semifinals 
Qualification rule: first 2 of each heat (Q) plus the 2 fastest times (q) qualified.

Heat 1

Heat 2

Heat 3

Final

References 

2013 World Youth Championships in Athletics
100 metres at the IAAF World Youth Championships in Athletics